Monument Municipal Airport  is a public airport located 1 mile (1.6 km) northwest of Monument, in Grant County, Oregon, United States.

External links
Photos of the airport by UncleTebo

Airports in Grant County, Oregon